Area codes 418, 581, and 367 are telephone area codes in the North American Numbering Plan (NANP) for the eastern portion of the Canadian province of Quebec. Area code 418 was originally assigned to the numbering plan area, but all three area codes now form an overlay plan for this territory. Cities in the numbering plan area include Quebec City, Saguenay, Lévis, Rimouski, Saint-Georges, Alma, Thetford Mines, Sept-Îles, Baie-Comeau and Rivière-du-Loup. Also served are the Gaspé Peninsula, Côte-Nord, southeastern Mauricie, and the tiny hamlet of Estcourt Station, in the U.S. state of Maine.

History
Ontario and Quebec were the only provinces that received assignments of multiple area codes by the American Telephone and Telegraph Company (AT&T) when the original North American area codes were created in 1947.

The eastern part of Quebec received area code 418, while area code 514 was assigned for the western part.  Nominally, northwestern Quebec, one of the few areas of North America without telephone service, was reassigned from area code 514 to area code 418 in 1957. From the 1950s to the 1970s, area code 418 was also the area code for the eastern Northwest Territories. However, in the 1970s, as direct distance dialling was introduced to the far northern and western portions of 418, those areas were reassigned to area code 819.

Despite Quebec City's rapid growth, by the turn of the millennium, area code 418 was the last of Quebec and Ontario's original four area codes not to have been split. By 2006, however, area code 418 was on the brink of exhaustion because of Canada's system of number allocation. Every competitive local exchange carrier is allocated blocks of 10,000 numbers, which correspond to a single three-digit prefix, for every rate centre in which it plans to offer service, even for small hamlets. Once a number is assigned to a carrier and rate centre, it cannot be moved elsewhere even if a rate centre has more than enough numbers to serve it. That resulted in thousands of wasted numbers, a problem that was worsened by the proliferation of cellphones and pagers, especially in the larger cities. Additionally, a number of "megacities" created in 2002 are split between multiple rate centres, which have never been amalgamated. For example, Saguenay is split between four rate centres.

In 2007, the CRTC assigned area code 581 as an overlay for 418. The implementation of area code 581 began on June 21, 2008 with the start of a permissive dialing period during which local calls could be made with both seven and ten digits. Ten-digit dialing became mandatory in eastern Quebec on September 6, 2008.

By 2016, area codes 418 and 581 were again on the brink of exhaustion because of the further proliferation of cell phones and pagers. In 2017, the CRTC assigned area code 367 as a second overlay for eastern Quebec. It entered service in 2018. That had the effect of assigning 23.4 million numbers to only 1.8 million people. However, overlays have become the preferred method of relief in Canada, as they are an easy workaround for the number allocation problem. No area codes have been split in the country since 1999.

The major incumbent local exchange carriers in the area are Bell Canada, Bell Aliant, Telus (formerly Quebec-Telephone) and Vidéotron.

Places and exchange codes in the service area
 Adstock: (418) 422 (581) 634
 Aguanish: (418) 533 (581) 299
 Albanel: (418) 279 501 (581) 601
 Albertville: see Causapscal
 Alma: (418) 212 301 319 321 347 442 450 480 481 482 487 662 668 669 719 720 758 769 (581) 200 216 230 265 431 533 598 728 828
 Amqui: (418) 330 629 631 713 (581) 335
 Armagh: (418) 466 (581) 328
 Auclair: see Témiscouata-sur-le-Lac
 Baie-Comeau: (418) 280 282 293 294 295 296 297 298 378 445 589 921 (581) 381 642 726 823 829 929 987
 Baie-des-Sables: (418) 772 (581) 396
 Baie-Johan-Beetz: (418) 539 (581) 298
 Baie-Saint-Paul: (418) 200 219 240 435 436 760 (581) 237
 Baie-Sainte-Catherine: (418) 237 (581) 236
 Baie-Trinité: (418) 920 939
 Batiscan: see Sainte-Geneviève-de-Batiscan
 Beauceville: (418) 217 774 (581) 420 813
 Beaulac-Garthby: (418) 458 (581) 228 330 835
 Beaumont: see Lévis
 Beaupré: (418) 702 746 827
 Bégin: see Saint-Ambroise
 Berthier-sur-Mer: see Saint-François-de-la-Rivière-du-Sud
 Biencourt: (418) 499 (581) 373
 Blanc-Sablon: (418) 461 (581) 297
 Boischatel: (418) 406 762 822 (581) 538
 Bonaventure: (418) 530 534 (581) 364 630 827
 Bonne-Espérance: (418) 379 (581) 296
 Cacouna: see Rivière-du-Loup
 Cap-Chat: (418) 786 (581) 395
 Cap-Saint-Ignace: (418) 246 715
 Cap-Santé: see Donnacona
 Caplan: (418) 388 (581) 363
 Carleton-sur-Mer: (418) 364 (581) 362
 Cascapédia–Saint-Jules: see New Richmond
 Causapscal: (418) 756 (581) 394
 Chambord: (418) 342 491 (581) 602 816
 Chandler: (418) 398 616 680 689 (581) 361
 Chapais: (418) 745
 Château-Richer: (418) 824 972 978
 Chibougamau: (418) 748 770 (581) 430 445 464 579 627
 Chute-aux-Outardes: see Pessamit
 Clermont: (418) 201 439 489 (581) 239
 Cloridorme: (418) 395 (581) 637
 Colombier: (418) 565 (581) 644
 Côte-Nord-du-Golfe-du-Saint-Laurent: (418) 242 787 795 (581) 293 295 301
 Courcelles: (418) 483
 Dégelis: (418) 494 853
 Deschambault-Grondines: see Portneuf
 Desbiens: (418) 346 (581) 597 817
 Disraeli: (418) 449 (581) 209 714
 Dolbeau-Mistassini: (418) 239 276 706 979 (581) 212 596
 Donnacona: (418) 283 284 285 326 462 510 552 850 971 (581) 343 377 740 821 833
 Dosquet: see Laurier-Station
 East Broughton: (418) 351 427 (581) 331
 Escuminac: see Listuguj
 Esprit-Saint: see Lac-des-Aigles
 Essipit: see Les Escoumins
 Estcourt Station, Maine  - see Pohénégamook
 Ferland-et-Boilleau: (418) 676 (581) 382
 Fermont: (418) 287 (581) 231 444
 Forestville: (418) 578 586 587 989 (581) 623
 Fossambault-sur-le-Lac: see Sainte-Catherine-de-la-Jacques-Cartier
 Frampton: (418) 479 (581) 227 426
 Franquelin: see Baie-Comeau
 Gaspé: (418) 269 355 360 361 368 892 (581) 348 360 635 636 822 832 887
 Gesgapegiag: see Maria
 Girardville: (418) 258 (581) 595 651
 Godbout: (418) 568
 Grand-Métis: see Mont-Joli
 Grande-Rivière: (418) 385 (581) 359
 Grande-Vallée: (418) 393 (581) 575 638 883
 Gros-Mécatina: (418) 773 (581) 289
 Grosse-Île: see Les Îles-de-la-Madeleine
 Grosses-Roches: see Sainte-Félicité
 Havre-Saint-Pierre: (418) 532 538 553 984 (581) 292
 Hébertville: (418) 344 (581) 594 718
 Hébertville-Station: see Saint-Bruno
 Hérouxville: see Saint-Tite
 Honfleur: see Saint-Anselme
 Hope: see Paspébiac
 Hope Town: see Paspébiac
 Inverness: (418) 453 470 (581) 272
 Irlande: see Saint-Ferdinand
 Kamouraska: see Saint-Pascal
 Kawawachikamach: (418) 585
 Kinnear's Mills: see Saint-Pierre-de-Broughton
 L'Ancienne-Lorette: see Québec City
 L'Ange-Gardien: see Boischatel
 L'Anse-Saint-Jean: (418) 272 608 (581) 390
 L'Ascension-de-Notre-Seigneur: see Alma
 L'Ascension-de-Patapédia: see Saint-François-d'Assise
 L'Île-d'Anticosti: (418) 535 (581) 286
 L'Isle-aux-Coudres: (418) 438 600 (581) 240
 L'Isle-Verte: (418) 898 (581) 648
 L'Islet: (418) 247 607
 La Doré: (418) 256 604 917 (581) 592
 La Durantaye: see Saint-Michel-de-Bellechasse
 La Guadeloupe: (418) 459 519 (581) 715
 La Malbaie: (418) 202 270 324 434 601 617 620 633 665 790 (581) 241 256 727
 La Martre: see Marsoui
 La Pocatière: (418) 371 856 (581) 213
 La Rédemption: see Mont-Joli
 La Romaine: (418) 229 (581) 291
 La Trinité-des-Monts: see Lac-des-Aigles
 Labrecque: see Alma
 Lac-au-Saumon: (418) 778 (581) 392
 Lac-aux-Sables: (418) 336 (581) 275
 Lac-Beauport: see Quebec City
 Lac-Bouchette: (418) 348 (581) 591 818
 Lac-Delage: see Stoneham-et-Tewkesbury
 Lac-des-Aigles: (418) 779 (581) 600
 Lac-Etchemin: (418) 625 (581) 215 820
 Lac-Frontière: (418) 245
 Lac-Jacques-Cartier: (418) 846 (581) 587
 Lac-John: see Kawawachikamach
 Lac-Poulin: see Saint-Georges
 Lac-Saint-Joseph: see Sainte-Catherine-de-la-Jacques-Cartier
 Lac-Sergent: see Sainte-Catherine-de-la-Jacques-Cartier
 Lamarche: see Alma
 Lambton: (418) 486
 Larouche: see Saguenay
 Laurier-Station: (418) 394 415 728 757
 Lejeune: see Saint-Michel-du-Squatec
 Les Bergeronnes: (418) 232 (581) 238 324
 Les Éboulements: (418) 635 975 (581) 242
 Les Escoumins: (418) 233 (581) 243 322
 Les Hauteurs: see Mont-Joli
 Les Îles-de-la-Madeleine: (418) 937 969 985 986
 Les Méchins: (418) 729 (581) 391
 Lévis: (418) 304 488 496 531 603 619 741 754 761 830 831 832 833 834 835 836 837 838 839 903 988 (581) 247 250 253 500 534 629 838 839 920
 Listuguj: (418) 788 (581) 352 
 Longue-Pointe-de-Mingan: (418) 949 (581) 284
 Longue-Rive: (418) 231 (581) 255 320
 Lotbinière: see Saint-Édouard-de-Lotbinière
 Maliotenam: see Sept-Îles
 Maria: (418) 759 (581) 358
 Marsoui: (418) 288 (581) 393
 Mashteuiatsh: see Roberval
 Matane: (418) 429 556 560 562 566 (581) 232 261 334 379 631 834
 Matapédia: (418) 320 865 (581) 884
 Matimekosh: see Kawawachikamach
 Métabetchouan–Lac-à-la-Croix: (418) 349 (581) 590 716
 Métis-sur-Mer: (418) 936
 Mingan: see Longue-Pointe-de-Mingan
 Mistissini: (418) 923
 Mont-Carmel: (418) 300 498
 Mont-Joli: (418) 775 785
 Mont-Saint-Pierre: see Saint-Maxime-du-Mont-Louis
 Montmagny: (418) 206 234 241 248 250 252 291 447 508 513 941 (581) 262 552 632 725
 Murdochville: (418) 784 (581) 639
 Natashquan: see Nutashkuan
 Neuville: (418) 791 876 909
 New Carlisle: see Paspébiac
 New Richmond: (418) 372 391 392 (581) 346 355 886
 Newport: (418) 777 (581) 356
 Normandin: (418) 274 792 (581) 588 719
 Notre-Dame-Auxiliatrice-de-Buckland: see Saint-Damien-de-Buckland
 Notre-Dame-de-Lorette: see Dolbeau-Mistassini
 Notre-Dame-de-Montauban: see Lac-aux-Sables
 Notre-Dame-des-Anges: see Québec City
 Notre-Dame-des-Monts: see Clermont
 Notre-Dame-des-Neiges: see Trois-Pistoles
 Notre-Dame-des-Pins: see Beauceville
 Notre-Dame-des-Sept-Douleurs: see L'Isle-Verte
 Notre-Dame-du-Portage: see Rivière-du-Loup
 Notre-Dame-du-Rosaire: see Saint-Paul-de-Montminy
 Notre-Dame-du-Sacré-Cœur-d'Issoudun: see Laurier-Station
 Nouvelle: (418) 794 (581) 354
 Nutashkuan: (418) 726 (581) 288 622
 Packington: see Dégelis
 Padoue: see Mont-Joli
 Paspébiac: (418) 375 751 752 (581) 233 357
 Passes-Dangereuses: (418) 377 (581) 599
 Percé: (418) 370 408 645 782 783 (581) 353 365
 Péribonka: (418) 374 793 (581) 586
 Pessamit: (418) 567 (581) 643
 Petit-Saguenay: see L'Anse-Saint-Jean
 Petite-Rivière-Saint-François: (418) 632 (581) 244 640
 Petite-Vallée: see Grande-Vallée
 Pohénégamook:  (418) 859 (581) 421
 Pointe-à-la-Croix: see Listuguj
 Pointe-aux-Outardes: see Pessamit
 Pointe-Lebel: see Baie-Comeau
 Pont-Rouge: (418) 399 410 813 873 (581) 329
 Port-Cartier: (418) 517 766 768 799 (581) 285 287 881
 Port-Daniel–Gascons: (418) 396 (581) 351
 Portneuf: (418) 286 913
 Portneuf-sur-Mer: (418) 238 (581) 260 323
 Price: see Mont-Joli
 Québec: (418) 204 208 210 254 255 260 261 262 263 264 265 266 271 316 317 353 380 407 425 431 440 446 454 455 456 463 473 476 478 520 521 522 523 524 525 527 528 529 554 558 559 561 563 564 569 570 571 572 573 574 575 576 577 580 609 614 621 622 623 624 626 627 628 634 640 641 643 644 646 647 648 649 650 651 652 653 654 655 656 657 658 659 660 661 663 664 666 667 670 681 682 683 684 686 687 688 691 692 694 704 708 717 747 767 780 781 800 801 802 803 805 806 808 809 821 840 841 842 843 845 847 849 861 864 871 872 874 877 890 905 906 907 914 915 922 925 928 929 930 931 932 933 934 948 951 952 953 955 956 977 990 997 998 999 (581) 201 251 300 305 307 308 309 313 316 317 318 319 349 366 400 401 450 531 578 580 628 681 700 701 702 703 704 705 741 742 745 777 781 814 836 888 922 925 927 928 981 982 983 984 985 986 989 990 991 994 995 996 997 998 999
 Ragueneau: see Pessamit
 Rimouski: (418) 318 416 509 712 721 722 723 724 725 727 730 731 732 734 735 736 740 749 750 896 (581) 246 314 456 525 624 720 824
 Ristigouche-Partie-Sud-Est: see Listuguj
 Rivière-à-Claude: see Saint-Maxime-du-Mont-Louis
 Rivière-à-Pierre: (418) 323
 Rivière-au-Tonnerre: (418) 465 (581) 304
 Rivière-aux-Outardes: (418) 584
 Rivière-Bleue: (418) 893 (581) 656
 Rivière-du-Loup: (418) 292 314 551 605 714 816 860 862 863 866 867 868 894 943 (581) 214 252 337 437 535 729
 Rivière-Éternité: see L'Anse-Saint-Jean
 Rivière-Ouelle: see La Pocatière
 Rivière-Saint-Jean: see Longue-Pointe-de-Mingan
 Roberval: (418) 275 765 900 996 (581) 217 442 585
 Sacré-Coeur: (418) 236 (581) 245 321
 Sacré-Coeur-de-Jésus: see East-Broughton
 Saguenay (418) 213 290 303 306 376 402 412 437 477 490 512 540 541 542 543 544 545 546 547 548 549 550 557 579 590 591 592 602 612 615 677 678 690 693 695 696 697 698 699 718 771 812 815 817 818 820 944 973 (581) 221 222 234 235 248 249 306 383 384 389 433 434 435 490 532 543 544 545 546 560 682 683 684 882
 Saint-Adalbert: see Saint-Pamphile
 Saint-Adelme: see Sainte-Félicité
 Saint-Adelphe: (418) 322 (581) 281
 Saint-Adrien-d'Irlande: see Thetford-Mines
 Saint-Agapit: (418) 401 888 918
 Saint-Aimé-des-Lacs: see Clermont
 Saint-Alban: see Saint-Marc-des-Carrières
 Saint-Alexandre-de-Kamouraska: (418) 495 970
 Saint-Alexandre-des-Lacs: see Lac-au-Saumon
 Saint-Alexis-de-Matapédia: see Saint-François-d'Assise
 Saint-Alfred: see Beauceville
 Saint-Alphonse: see Caplan
 Saint-Ambroise: (418) 352 526 672 (581) 385
 Saint-Anaclet-de-Lessard: see Rimouski
 Saint-André-de-Kamouraska: (418) 363 493
 Saint-André-de-Restigouche: see Matapédia
 Saint-André-du-Lac-Saint-Jean: see Métabetchouan-Lac-à-la-Croix
 Saint-Anselme: (418) 885 982
 Saint-Antoine-de-l'Isle-aux-Grues: see Montmagny
 Saint-Antoine-de-Tilly: (418) 413 886
 Saint-Antonin: see Rivière-du-Loup
 Saint-Apollinaire: (418) 433 881 981
 Saint-Arsène: see Rivière-du-Loup
 Saint-Athanase: see Rivière-du-Loup
 Saint-Aubert: see Saint-Jean-Port-Joli
 Saint-Augustin: (418) 947 (581) 302
 Saint-Augustin: see Péribonka
 Saint-Augustin-de-Desmaures: (418) 327 870 878 880 908
 Saint-Basile: (418) 329 500 (581) 930
 Saint-Benjamin: see Saint-Prosper
 Saint-Benoît-Labre: see Saint-Georges
 Saint-Bernard: (418) 475 (581) 223 427
 Saint-Bruno: (418) 343 (581) 593 717
 Saint-Bruno-de-Kamouraska: see Saint-Pascal
 Saint-Camille-de-Lellis: (418) 595
 Saint-Casimir: (418) 339 (581) 276
 Saint-Charles-de-Bellechasse: (418) 887 916
 Saint-Charles-de-Bourget: see Saint-Ambroise
 Saint-Charles-Garnier: see Mont-Joli
 Saint-Clément: see Saint-Jean-de-Dieu
 Saint-Cléophas: see Sayabec
 Saint-Côme–Linière: (418) 685 (581) 312
 Saint-Cyprien: see Saint-Jean-de-Dieu
 Saint-Cyprien: see Sainte-Justine
 Saint-Cyrille-de-Lessard: see L'Islet
 Saint-Damase: see Saint-Moïse
 Saint-Damase-de-L'Islet: see Saint-Jean-Port-Joli
 Saint-Damien-de-Buckland: (418) 467 789
 Saint-David-de-Falardeau: see Saint-Honoré
 Saint-Denis-De La Bouteillerie: see Mont-Carmel
 Saint-Donat: see Mont-Joli
 Saint-Edmond-les-Plaines: see Normandin
 Saint-Édouard-de-Lotbinière: (418) 703 796
 Saint-Éloi: see L'Isle-Verte
 Saint-Elzéar-de-Témiscouata: see Témiscouata-sur-le-Lac
 Saint-Elzéar: see Sainte-Marie
 Saint-Elzéar: see Bonaventure
 Saint-Éphrem-de-Beauce: (418) 484
 Saint-Épiphane: see Rivière-du-Loup
 Saint-Eugène-d'Argentenay: see Dolbeau-Mistassini
 Saint-Eugène-de-Ladrière: see Saint-Fabien
 Saint-Eusèbe: see Témiscouata-sur-le-Lac
 Saint-Évariste-de-Forsyth: see La Guadeloupe
 Saint-Fabien: (418) 869
 Saint-Fabien-de-Panet: (418) 249
 Saint-Félicien: (418) 218 307 515 518 613 618 630 637 671 679 879 (581) 218 438 583 721
 Saint-Félix-d'Otis: see Saguenay
 Saint-Ferdinand: (418) 428 (581) 208 270 712
 Saint-Ferréol-les-Neiges: (418) 405 826 992
 Saint-Flavien: see Laurier-Station
 Saint-François-d'Assise: (418) 299
 Saint-François-de-l'Île-d'Orléans: see Saint-Jean-de-l'Île-d'Orléans
 Saint-François-de-la-Rivière-du-Sud: (418) 259 472
 Saint-François-de-Sales: see Lac-Bouchette
 Saint-François-Xavier-de-Viger: see Saint-Hubert-de-Rivière-du-Loup
 Saint-Frédéric: see Tring-Jonction
 Saint-Fulgence: (418) 309 502 674 (581) 386
 Saint-Gabriel-de-Rimouski: (418) 798
 Saint-Gabriel-de-Valcartier: see Shannon
 Saint-Gabriel-Lalemant: see Saint-Pacôme
 Saint-Gédéon: (418) 345 (581) 582 815
 Saint-Gédéon-de-Beauce: (418) 582
 Saint-Georges: (418) 215 220 221 222 225 226 227 228 230 278 313 957 974 (581) 220 372 378 649 722 825 831
 Saint-Germain-de-Kamouraska: see Saint-Pascal
 Saint-Gervais: see Saint-Charles-de-Bellechasse
 Saint-Gilbert: see Saint-Marc-des-Carrières
 Saint-Gilles: see Saint-Agapit
 Saint-Godefroi: see Paspébiac
 Saint-Guy: see Saint-Jean-de-Dieu
 Saint-Henri: (418) 700 858 882 891 895 924 (581) 350 551 633
 Saint-Henri-de-Taillon: see Alma
 Saint-Hilaire-de-Dorset: see La Guadeloupe
 Saint-Hilarion: (418) 400 457 (581) 257
 Saint-Honoré: (418) 312 503 673 (581) 388
 Saint-Honoré-de-Shenley: (418) 485 (581) 713
 Saint-Honoré-de-Témiscouata: see Saint-Hubert-de-Rivière-du-Loup
 Saint-Hubert-de-Rivière-du-Loup: (418) 497 910 (581) 650
 Saint-Irénée: (418) 452 (581) 258 326
 Saint-Isidore: (418) 882
 Saint-Jacques-de-Leeds: see Saint-Pierre-de-Broughton
 Saint-Jacques-le-Majeur-de-Wolfestown: see Disraeli
 Saint-Janvier-de-Joly: see Laurier-Station
 Saint-Jean-de-Brébeuf: see Inverness
 Saint-Jean-de-Cherbourg: see Sainte-Félicité
 Saint-Jean-de-Dieu: (418) 963 (581) 646
 Saint-Jean-de-l'Île-d'Orléans: (418) 203 829 994
 Saint-Jean-de-la-Lande: see Dégelis
 Saint-Joachim: see Beaupré
 Saint-Jean-Port-Joli: (418) 358 598
 Saint-Joseph-de-Beauce: (418) 397 993 (581) 226 374 428
 Saint-Joseph-de-Coleraine: see Thetford-Mines
 Saint-Joseph-de-Kamouraska: see Saint-André-de-Kamouraska
 Saint-Joseph-de-Lepage: see Mont-Joli
 Saint-Joseph-des-Érables: see Saint-Joseph-de-Beauce
 Saint-Jules: see Saint-Joseph-de-Beauce
 Saint-Julien: see Thetford-Mines
 Saint-Just-de-Bretenières: (418) 244
 Saint-Juste-du-Lac: see Témiscouata-sur-le-Lac
 Saint-Lambert-de-Lauzon: (418) 205 417 889
 Saint-Laurent-de-l'Île-d'Orléans: see Saint-Pierre-de-l'Île-d'Orléans
 Saint-Lazare-de-Bellechasse: see Sainte-Claire
 Saint-Léandre: see Saint-Ulric
 Saint-Léon-de-Standon: see Saint-Malachie
 Saint-Léon-le-Grand: (418) 743 (581) 342
 Saint-Léonard-de-Portneuf: see Saint-Raymond
 Saint-Louis-de-Gonzague: see Sainte-Rose-de-Watford
 Saint-Louis-de-Gonzague-du-Cap-Tourmente: see Beaupré
 Saint-Louis-du-Ha! Ha!: see Témiscouata-sur-le-Lac
 Saint-Luc-de-Bellechasse: (418) 636
 Saint-Ludger-de-Milot: (418) 302 373 (581) 589
 Saint-Magloire: (418) 257
 Saint-Malachie: (418) 642
 Saint-Marc-des-Carrières: (418) 268 403 (581) 277 325
 Saint-Marc-du-Lac-Long: see Rivière-Bleue
 Saint-Marcel: see Saint-Pamphile
 Saint-Marcellin: see Saint-Gabriel-de-Rimouski
 Saint-Martin: (418) 382
 Saint-Mathieu-de-Rioux: (418) 738 (581) 457
 Saint-Maxime-du-Mont-Louis: (418) 797 (581) 347
 Saint-Médard: see Saint-Jean-de-Dieu
 Saint-Michel-de-Bellechasse: (418) 804 884
 Saint-Michel-du-Squatec: (418) 855 (581) 647
 Saint-Modeste: see Rivière-du-Loup
 Saint-Moïse: (418) 776
 Saint-Narcisse: (418) 328 (581) 278
 Saint-Narcisse-de-Beaurivage: see Saint-Bernard
 Saint-Narcisse-de-Rimouski: see Rimouski
 Saint-Nazaire: see Alma
 Saint-Nazaire-de-Dorchester: see Saint-Malachie
 Saint-Nérée-de-Bellechasse: see Saint-Raphaël
 Saint-Noël: see Saint-Moïse
 Saint-Octave-de-Métis: see Mont-Joli
 Saint-Odilon-de-Cranbourne: (418) 464
 Saint-Omer: see Saint-Pamphile
 Saint-Onésime-d'Ixworth: see La Pocatière
 Saint-Pacôme: (418) 315 852
 Saint-Pamphile: (418) 356 357 432 710
 Saint-Pascal: (418) 308 492
 Saint-Patrice-de-Beaurivage: (418) 596 (581) 229 429
 Saint-Paul-de-la-Croix: see L'Isle-Verte
 Saint-Paul-de-Montminy: (418) 469 (581) 332
 Saint-Philémon: see Saint-Paul-de-Montminy
 Saint-Philibert: see Saint-Georges
 Saint-Philippe-de-Néri: see Mont-Carmel
 Saint-Pierre-Baptiste: see Inverness
 Saint-Pierre-de-Broughton: (418) 424 (581) 271
 Saint-Pierre-de-l'Île-d'Orléans: (418) 828 991 995
 Saint-Pierre-de-la-Rivière-du-Sud: see Montmagny
 Saint-Pierre-de-Lamy: see Saint-Hubert-de-Rivière-du-Loup
 Saint-Prime: (418) 251 451 902 (581) 584
 Saint-Prosper: (418) 594 (581) 315
 Saint-Raphaël: (418) 243 705
 Saint-Raymond: (418) 216 337 340 987
 Saint-René: see Saint-Martin
 Saint-René-de-Matane: (418) 224 (581) 341
 Saint-Robert-Bellarmin: see Saint-Gédéon-de-Beauce
 Saint-Roch-des-Aulnaies: (418) 354 919 (581) 885
 Saint-Romain: see Lambton
 Saint-Séverin: see Tring-Jonction
 Saint-Séverin: see Saint-Tite
 Saint-Siméon: (418) 471 638 (581) 264
 Saint-Siméon: see Bonaventure
 Saint-Simon-de-Rimouski: see Saint-Mathieu-de-Rioux
 Saint-Simon-les-Mines: see Beauceville
 Saint-Stanislas: see Saint-Narcisse
 Saint-Stanislas: see Dolbeau-Mistassini
 Saint-Sylvestre: see Saint-Patrice-de-Beaurivage
 Saint-Tharcisius: see Amqui
 Saint-Théophile: (418) 597
 Saint-Thomas-Didyme: see Normandin
 Saint-Thuribe: see Saint-Casimir
 Saint-Tite: (418) 365 366 419 507 716 954 (581) 279
 Saint-Tite-des-Caps: (418) 823 901
 Saint-Ubalde: (418) 277 (581) 280
 Saint-Ulric: (418) 737 (581) 340
 Saint-Urbain: (418) 639 (581) 259 641
 Saint-Valérien: see Rimouski
 Saint-Vallier: see Saint-Michel-de-Bellechasse
 Saint-Vianney: see Amqui
 Saint-Victor: (418) 588
 Saint-Zacharie: (418) 593
 Saint-Zénon-du-Lac-Humqui: see Saint-Léon-le-Grand
 Sainte-Agathe-de-Lotbinière: (418) 599 (581) 422
 Sainte-Angèle-de-Mérici: see Mont-Joli
 Sainte-Anne-de-Beaupré: see Beaupré
 Sainte-Anne-de-la-Pérade: (418) 325 707 (581) 282
 Sainte-Anne-de-la-Pocatière: see La Pocatière
 Sainte-Anne-des-Monts: (418) 763 764 904 967 (581) 338
 Sainte-Apolline-de-Patton: see Saint-Paul-de-Montminy
 Sainte-Aurélie: see Saint-Zacharie
 Sainte-Brigitte-de-Laval: (418) 606 825
 Sainte-Catherine-de-la-Jacques-Cartier: (418) 441 875
 Sainte-Christine-d'Auvergne: see Saint-Basile
 Sainte-Claire: (418) 807 883 897 966 983
 Sainte-Clotilde-de-Beauce: see East-Broughton
 Sainte-Croix: (418) 701 926
 Sainte-Euphémie-sur-Rivière-du-Sud: see Saint-Paul-de-Montminy
 Sainte-Famille-de-l'Île-d'Orléans: see Saint-Jean-de-l'Île-d'Orléans
 Sainte-Félicité: (418) 733 (581) 344
 Sainte-Flavie: see Mont-Joli
 Sainte-Florence: see Causapscal
 Sainte-Françoise: see Trois-Pistoles
 Sainte-Geneviève-de-Batiscan: (418) 362 (581) 274
 Sainte-Hélène-de-Kamouraska: see Saint-Pascal
 Sainte-Hénédine: (418) 504 935 (581) 423
 Sainte-Hedwidge: see Roberval
 Sainte-Irène: see Amqui
 Sainte-Jeanne-d'Arc: see Dolbeau-Mistassini
 Sainte-Jeanne-d'Arc: see Mont-Joli
 Sainte-Justine: (418) 383
 Sainte-Louise: see Saint-Roch-des-Aulnaies
 Sainte-Luce: (418) 739
 Sainte-Lucie-de-Beauregard: (418) 223
 Sainte-Madeleine-de-la-Rivière-Madeleine: see Grande-Vallée
 Sainte-Marguerite: see Sainte-Hénédine
 Sainte-Marguerite-Marie: see Causapscal
 Sainte-Marie: (418) 207 209 369 381 386 387 389 390 420 421 448 945 (581) 224 375 424 550
 Sainte-Monique: see Alma
 Sainte-Paule: see Saint-Ulric
 Sainte-Perpétue: (418) 359
 Sainte-Pétronille: see Saint-Pierre-de-l'Île-d'Orléans
 Sainte-Praxède: see Disraeli
 Sainte-Rita: see Saint-Jean-de-Dieu
 Sainte-Rose-de-Watford: (418) 267
 Sainte-Rose-du-Nord: (418) 675 (581) 387
 Sainte-Sabine: see Sainte-Justine
 Sainte-Thècle: (418) 289 (581) 283
 Sainte-Thérèse-de-Gaspé: see Grande-Rivière
 Saints-Anges: see Vallée-Jonction
 Sayabec: (418) 536 (581) 345
 Schefferville: see Kawawachikamach
 Scott: see Sainte-Marie
 Sept-Îles: (418) 350 409 444 583 927 960 961 962 964 965 968 (581) 290 294 303 339 380 826 830
 Shannon: (418) 404 844 (581) 376
 Shigawake: see Paspébiac
 Stoneham-et-Tewkesbury: (418) 384 848 912 (581) 837
 Stratford: (418) 443 (581) 269
 Tadoussac: (418) 214 235 514 980 (581) 263 327
 Témiscouata-sur-le-Lac: (418) 854 899 938 940
 Thetford Mines: (418) 281 305 331 332 333 334 335 338 341 423 430 755 814 946 (581) 254 266 268 333 399 440 679 680 724 840
 Tourville: see Sainte-Perpétue
 Tring-Jonction: (418) 426 505 (581) 267
 Trois-Pistoles: (418) 516 851 857 (581) 645
 Uashat: see Sept-Îles
 Val-Alain: (418) 414 744
 Val-Brillant: (418) 742 (581) 336
 Vallée-Jonction: (418) 253 (581) 225 425
 Wendake: see Quebec City
 shared-cost service: (418) 310
 Premium services: 1+(367/418/581) 976.

See also
List of NANP area codes

References

External links
CNA exchange list for area +1-418
CNA exchange list for area +1-581
Telecom archives
Area Code 418 relief activities
 Area Code Map of Canada

367 418 581
Communications in Quebec